Nick Galle (born 14 September 1998) is a German professional footballer who plays as a left-back for Wuppertaler SV.

Career

Hallescher FC 
In May 2019, Galle joined Hallescher FC on a free transfer from Fortuna Düsseldorf II.

Galle made his professional debut for Hallescher FC in the 3. Liga on 31 July 2019, starting in the away match against Viktoria Köln which finished as a 2–0 win.

Alemannia Aachen 
On 6 October 2021, Galle joined Regionalliga club Alemannia Aachen.

1. FC Saarbrücken 
On 11 May 2021, it was announced that Galle would join 1. FC Saarbrücken for the 2021–22 season.

Wuppertaler SV
On 27 January 2022, Galle moved to Wuppertaler SV in Regionalliga West.

References

External links
 
 Profile at kicker.de

1998 births
Living people
German footballers
Association football fullbacks
Fortuna Düsseldorf II players
Hallescher FC players
Alemannia Aachen players
1. FC Saarbrücken players
Wuppertaler SV players
3. Liga players
Regionalliga players